Ertegün is a Turkish surname. Notable people with the surname include:
 Ertegün brothers, Turkish-American executives of Atlantic Records
 Ahmet Ertegün
 Nesuhi Ertegün
 Münir Ertegün, Turkish politician and diplomat and father of Ahmet and Nesuhi Ertegün

Turkish-language surnames